This is a list of notable, professional, and female racing drivers or riders in any form of motorsport, sorted by country alphabetically.

Albania

 Desara Muriqi born

Andorra
 Margot Llobera born

Argentina

Australia

Austria

Belgium

Brazil

Bulgaria
 Ekaterina Stratieva born

Canada

Chile

Colombia

 Tatiana Calderón born

Czechia

Denmark

 Michelle Gatting born 
 Christina Nielsen born

Estonia
 Anastassia Kovalenko born

Finland
 Emma Kimiläinen born 
 Taru Rinne born

France

Germany

Hong Kong
 Denise Yeung

Hungary

India
 Alisha Abdullah born 
 Chithra Priya born 
 Sneha Sharma born

Iran
 Laleh Seddigh born 1977
 Noora Naraghi born

Ireland
 Sarah Kavanagh born 
 Rosemary Smith born 
 Fay Taylour born 5 April 1904, died 2 August 1983 (aged 79)

Italy

Japan

Kazakhstan
 Lyubov Ozeretskovskaya born

Latvia
 Karlīne Štāla born

Liechtenstein

 Fabienne Wohlwend born

Malaysia
  born 
 Natasha Seatter born

Mexico
 Mara Reyes born

Netherlands

New Zealand

Norway
 Ayla Ågren born 
  born 
 Hedda Hosås born

Philippines
 Michele Bumgarner born 
 Bianca Bustamante born 
 Gaby Dela Merced born

Poland

 Natalia Kowalska born 
 Małgorzata Rdest born

Portugal
  born 
 Joana Lemos born 
  born

Qatar
 Nada Zeidan born

Russia

 Irina Sidorkova born

Rwanda
 Naomi Schiff born

Saudi Arabia

 Aseel Al-Hamad
 Reema Juffali born

South Africa
 Tasmin Pepper born 
 Desiré Wilson born

Spain

Sweden

Switzerland

Thailand
 Nattanid Leewattanavaragul born

Turkey
 Burcu Çetinkaya born

Ukraine
  born

United Arab Emirates
 Amna Al Qubaisi born 
 Hamda Al Qubaisi born 
 Aliyyah Koloc born

United Kingdom

United States

Venezuela
 Milka Duno born 
 Samin Gómez born

See also
List of female Formula One drivers
List of female Indy 500 drivers
List of female NASCAR drivers
List of female 24 Hours of Le Mans drivers

References

External links
Racing Reference
Driver Database
Speedqueens

 
Female